Harlow v. Fitzgerald, 457 U.S. 800 (1982), was a case decided by the United States Supreme Court involving the doctrines of qualified immunity and absolute immunity.

Background
Arthur Ernest Fitzgerald was a deputy for management systems in the Office of the Secretary of the Air Force. He discovered $2 billion in cost overruns and technical problems in the Lockheed C5-A program that had been concealed by the officials at the Pentagon. He testified before the Joint Economic Committee in Congress and was then blacklisted from roles of any significance. 

Following the release of the Watergate tapes, Fitzgerald was mentioned by President Richard Nixon, who boasted that he had been responsible for firing Fitzgerald.

Fitzgerald filed a lawsuit against government officials claiming that he lost his position as a contractor with the US Air Force because of his whistleblower testimony made before Congress in 1969. Absolute immunity was claimed by the officials involved, including Nixon and several of his aides, which generated several additional cases that made their way to the Supreme Court. Nixon was named in the lawsuit but was found to have absolute immunity in his role as President, as decided in Nixon v. Fitzgerald.

Harlow v. Fitzgerald examined whether that degree of immunity extended to the President's aides.

Opinion
In an 8–1 decision, the Court held that government officials other than the President were generally entitled to qualified immunity. An official can obtain absolute immunity but must "first show that the responsibilities of his office embraced a function so sensitive as to require a total shield from liability. He must then demonstrate that he was discharging the protected function when performing the act for which liability is asserted."

Despite its immediate application to White House aides, the case is regarded as most important for its revision of the qualified immunity standard that is applicable to government actors, more generally. The Court held that "government officials performing discretionary functions, generally are shielded from liability for civil damages insofar as their conduct does not violate clearly established statutory or constitutional rights of which a reasonable person would have known."

References

External links 

United States Supreme Court cases
1982 in United States case law
Second Enforcement Act of 1871 case law
United States Supreme Court cases of the Burger Court